David Goertz (born March 28, 1965) is a Canadian former professional ice hockey player who played two games in the National Hockey League for the Pittsburgh Penguins.

Goertz was born in Edmonton, Alberta.

Career statistics

External links

1965 births
Living people
Baltimore Skipjacks players
Canadian expatriate ice hockey players in the United States
Canadian ice hockey defencemen
Pittsburgh Penguins players
Pittsburgh Penguins draft picks
Prince Albert Raiders players
Regina Pats players
Ice hockey people from Edmonton